Marconi is a station on line B of the Rome Metro. It is located at the point where the via Ostiense passes under the viale Guglielmo Marconi, after which it is named. Its exits are located on viale Marconi and via Ostiense.

Before it opened, there was a "EUR Marconi" station, now renamed "EUR Palasport".

Surroundings 
Università Roma Tre
former cinodromo di Ponte Marconi
Ponte Marconi, from which runs a motorboat along the Tiber to Ostia Antica

External links 

ATAC
Met.Ro S.p.A

Rome Metro Line B stations
Railway stations opened in 1993
1993 establishments in Italy
Rome Q. X Ostiense
Railway stations in Italy opened in the 20th century